Kolenča Vas is a small settlement in the Municipality of Dobrepolje in Slovenia. The area is part of the traditional region of Lower Carniola. The municipality is now included in the Central Slovenia Statistical Region.

References

External links
Kolenča Vas on Geopedia

Populated places in the Municipality of Dobrepolje